The 2012 ASEAN Basketball League season was the third season of competition of the ASEAN Basketball League (ABL) since its establishment. A total of eight teams will compete the league. The regular season will begin on 16 January 2012 and will end on 13 May 2012. Three teams will debut this season: the Bangkok Cobras, the San Miguel Beermen and the SSA Saigon Heat, while the Brunei Barracudas team took a leave of absence. Satria Muda BritAma was renamed into the Indonesia Warriors, while the Westports KL Dragons were renamed as the Westports Malaysia Dragons, and Singapore Slingers were renamed Jobstreet.com Singapore Slingers.

The season was delayed until January 2012 to give way to the Southeast Asian Games.

Preseason
The ABL underwent expansion with three new teams debuting. The San Miguel Beermen signed a five-year contract with the league; this is a different team from the Philippine Basketball Association (PBA) team owned by San Miguel Corporation that now carries the Petron Blaze Boosters name. Bobby Parks was named as the head coach.

Bangkok Basketball Holdings were the second team to join the league. The team will be the second Thai team, after the defending champions Chang Thailand Slammers. The third team to join the league was SSA Saigon Heat organised by the Saigon Sports Academy. The Heat are the first international basketball team to represent Vietnam.

The Brunei Barracudas, a team that has failed to make it to the playoffs in the league's first two seasons, has decided not participate in the 2012 season. While no reason was given, the team has heavily relied on its starting five, who are all imports, to play the game in its entirety.

Six of the eight teams participated in the To Be Number One Basketball Challenge held in Bangkok in benefit of the victims of the 2011 Thailand floods. The San Miguel Beermen defeated the AirAsia Philippine Patriots to win the championship. In 2012, the Beermen, the Patriots and the Qatari team Al -Jaysh will participate in another preseason tournament at the Ynares Sports Arena in Pasig.

Arenas

*these are indoor arenas located adjacent to the outdoor stadiums.

Standings

Results
Score of the home team is listed first.
In case where a game went into overtime, the number of asterisks denotes the number of overtime periods played.

First and second round

Third round

Statistical leaders

Playoffs

Semi-finals
The semi-finals is a best-of-three series, with the higher seeded team hosting Game 1, and 3, if necessary.

|}

Finals
The Finals is a best-of-three series, with the higher seeded team hosting Game 1, and 3, if necessary.

|}

References

External links
 Official website

 
2011–12 in Asian basketball leagues
2011-12
2011–12 in Philippine basketball
2011–12 in Malaysian basketball
2011–12 in Indonesian basketball
2011–12 in Singaporean basketball
2011–12 in Thai basketball
basketball
Bask